The 2021 Étoile de Bessèges was a road cycling stage race that took place between 3 and 7 February 2021 mostly in the French department of Gard. The race was rated as a 2.1 event as part of the 2021 UCI Europe Tour, and was the 51st edition of the Étoile de Bessèges cycling race.

Teams
Twenty-two teams were invited to the race. The invited teams include eleven UCI WorldTeams, eight UCI ProTeams, and three UCI Continental teams. Before the race began,  withdrew after one of the team's management was suspected of having COVID-19. Of the 145 riders that started the race, 135 finished.

UCI WorldTeams

 
 
 
 
 
 
 
 
 
 
 

UCI ProTeams

 
 
 
 
 
 
 
 

UCI Continental Teams

Route

Stages

Stage 1
3 February 2021 – Bellegarde to Bellegarde,

Stage 2
4 February 2021 – Saint-Geniès-de-Malgoirès to La Calmette,

Stage 3
5 February 2021 – Bessèges to Bessèges,

Stage 4
6 February 2021 – Rousson to Saint-Siffret,

Stage 5
7 February 2021 – Alès to Alès, (ITT)

Classification leadership table

Final classification standings

General classification

Points classification

Mountains classification

Young rider classification

Team classification

References

External links
 

2021
Étoile de Bessèges
Étoile de Bessèges
Étoile de Bessèges